Japanese football in 1967

Japan Soccer League

Japanese Regional Leagues

Emperor's Cup

National team

Results

Players statistics

External links

 
Seasons in Japanese football